Jim Sikora is a Chicago based American film director, writer, and producer and is considered a pioneer in DV filmmaking. Sikora is best known for his independent  micro-budgeted feature films Walls in the City, starring Paula Killen, Bill Cusack, Tony Fitzpatrick, and David Yow of the rock band The Jesus Lizard, with a soundtrack by The Denison/Kimball Trio; Bullet on a Wire starring Jeff Strong, Paula Killen, Lara Phillips, David Yow, and Cinema of Transgression legend Richard Kern; Rock & Roll Punk which features members of Hüsker Dü, The Descendents, Big Black, Tortoise, and Slint; My Charbroiled Burger with Brewer starring Mike Watt of Minutemen and The Stooges and Jack Brewer of Saccharine Trust.

Sikora's films and videos have aired everywhere from MTV's 120 Minutes to PBS's Image Union. His film Bullet on a Wire was shown in 18 film festivals in the United States, and worldwide, including the Rotterdam International Film Festival, The Munich International Film Festival, and in London at the ICA as part of the American Underground Cinema retrospective. The film also made Kevin Thomas's list as one of the best movies of 1998 in the LA Times.

Sikora has had successful theatrical runs of his pictures in New York City, Chicago, and Los Angeles.

Sikora (born James Vincent Lato III) was raised in Chicago, Illinois, and in the Chicago area. He attended Columbia College Chicago on the G.I. Bill after being honorably discharged from the U.S. Army. While at Columbia, he was classmates and contemporaries with cinematographers Janusz Kamiński and Mauro Fiore. He has made music videos and promos for labels such as SST Records, Touch & Go, Amphetamine Reptile, Arista, and Rykodisk. The bands he's created videos and promos for are as varied and diverse as Urge Overkill, The Frogs, The Leaving Trains, Mike Watt, The Jesus Lizard, Pegboy, Mutts, Enuff Z' Nuff, The Screaming Trees, Greg Ginn of Black Flag, and The Roots.

Jim has produced and directed the feature film The Earl, written by internationally acclaimed playwright Brett Neveu, and The Critics, written by novelist and playwright Adam Langer. His short films include Bring Me The Head of Geraldo Rivera, named by Film Threat Magazine as one of the best underground films of the decade; Stagefright Chameleon, and X-Mass '73. 

Amongst the projects that Jim has in various stages of development are his screenplay I'll Die Tomorrow, starring Michael Shannon, and Beyond The Shadows, written by Terry Southern.

References

External links 

 Mutts Music Video
 Jim Sikora's Pioneering Digital Feature Rock & Roll Punk plays at the Gene Siskel Film Center
 New York Times feature: Bullet On A Wire, Directed by Jim Sikora
 Dennison Kimball Trio - Soundtrack for Walls In The City by Jim Sikora
 Austin Chronicle 1997 South By Southwest article on screening Bullet On A Wire
 Dope Gun's And Fucking Up Your Video Deck - Vol. 1-3 1990-94 on Amphetamine Reptile Records with the video for Les Paul Worries by Tar, directed by Jim Sikora, Peeling Eyeball Productions
 Chicago Reader article on I'll Die Tomorrow with Michael Shannon
 Reel 360 article: Jim Sikora feature The Critics, 12 years in the making
 CUFF Chicago Underground Film Fest Jim Sikora video showcase
 Chicago Underground Film Festival Features Filmmakers Far From Mainstream Review by Roger Ebert
 Lumpen Television Interview with Filmmaker Jim Sikora
 Walls In The City and Bullet On A Wire on Mondo Digital
 Chicago Tribune article: Acting Bug Bites Jesus Lizard'S David Yow
 Emphasis Entertainment page for Bullet On A Wire
 Indie Wire article about Laramie Film Company debuts Bullet On A Wire
 Jonathan Rosenbaum on Bullet On A Wire
 Chicago Journal article on the film Critics, Directed by Jim Sikora
 Vice Interview with David Yow About Baseball and Movies
 Variety Magazine reviews Bullet On A Wire
 Filmmaker Magazine, Jim Sikora
 Chicago Filmmakers on the Chicago River
 Theater Mania - Unearthing Terry Southern
 Chicago Theater Beat Reviews film The Earl, Directed by Jim Sikora
 David Yow Is Done With Music, but His World Remains a Stage, Willamette Week
 Ikonen Magazine: Bullet On A Wire
 Danny Plotnick Film Compilation with Jim Sikora
 Digital Journal: Chicago Underground Film Festival Will Unspool 18 New Features; CUFF 2000 Rocks: Music and film collide in Jim Sikora's punk reminiscence My Char Broiled Burger With Brewer
 Jim Sikora at IFFR
 Other Cinema Interview with Jack Sergeant mentioning underground filmmaker Jim Sikora
 Mubi page: Bullet On A Wire

American filmmakers
Year of birth missing (living people)
Living people